The Florida Southern Moccasins football team represented Florida Southern College in the sport of American football. Florida Southern fielded a football team from 1912 to 1935, with a break during the 1918 season. From 1926 to 1930 it was a member of the Southern Intercollegiate Athletic Association. In 1913, Florida Southern lost to Florida, 144–0. In 1919, Southern upset the Gators, 7–0. Prior to 1925, the team was known as the Blue and White.

References

 
American football teams established in 1912
American football teams disestablished in 1935
1912 establishments in Florida
1935 disestablishments in Florida